Evangelos "Vangelis" Cheimonas (Βαγγέλης Χειμώνας; born 12 April 1980) is a sailing athlete since 1992.

Athlete 
He began his career in the Optimist class and subsequently continued competing in the “420” and “470” class double-handed boats. Since 1996 he competed as a professional athlete in the “Laser” Olympic sailing class and he has been a member of the National Olympic Sailing Team of Greece since 2004.He participated in 3 Olympic Games; in Athens 2004, Beijing 2008 and London 2012. The most significant titles in his athletic career have been the bronze medal in the 2002 ISAF World Championship and the bronze medal in the 2009 Mediterranean Games. He participated in major big boat world sailing events, such as the class TP52 as well as in Match Racing with several national titles.

Athletic Career titles in Laser Class 

Bronze medal ISAF World Championship 2002.

Bronze medal Mediterranean Games 2009.

16th in Olympic Games Athens 2004.

15th in Olympic Games Beijing 2008.

26th in Olympic Games London 2012.

11 times National Champion.

7th in Laser Standard Europeans 2005 and 2011.

2nd in Radial Youth Worlds 1998.

5th in Radial Men Worlds 1999.

3rd in Radial Men Worlds 2000.

Coach 
He has been coaching professionally since 2009 at the Nautical Club of Vouliagmeni in Athens, the largest and most prestigious sailing club in Greece (http://www.nov.gr). As a coach he has won 2 World Championships and 3 European Championships, 1 Gold Medal In Mediterranean Games and 18 Medals in European and World Championships.

Vangelis is a professional skipper, certified by the Royal Yachting Association (RYA) and holds the Yachtmaster offshore certificate.

Coaching career titles in Laser Class International titles 

2022: 2nd in ILCA 4 Europeans-Evelina Karageorgou

2021: European Champion in Laser 4.7-Kifidis Thanos

2021: 6th in Laser 4.7 European Championship-Valiadis Jason

2021: 7th in Laser Radial European Championship U17-Valiadis Jason

2021: 7th in Laser 4.7 European Championship U16-Iro Kouravelou

2020: 10th in Laser 4.7 European Championship U16- Valiadis Jason

2019: 3rd in Laser Standard European Championship U21-Dimitris Papadimitriou

2018: Bronze Medal in Asian Games Laser Radial Women and Qualification for

2020: Olympic Games-Shazrin Latif (Malaysia)

2018: Gold Medal in Mediterranean Games Laser Radial Women –Nancy Fakidi

2018: European Champion Laser Radial U19-Pantelis Kirpoglou

2018: World Champion Laser Standard U19-Dimitris Papadimitriou

2017: World Champion in Radial Youth Worlds-Dimitris Papadimitriou.

2017: 2nd in Radial Youth Europeans-Dimitris Papadimitriou.

2017: 2nd in U21 Radial Europeans-Dimitris Papadimitriou.

2017: 3rd in Radial Men Europeans-Dimitris Papadimitriou.

2016: World Champion 4,7 Youth Worlds-Dimitris Papadimitriou.

2016: European Champion 4,7 Youth Europeans-Dimitris Papadimitriou.

2016: 9th in Radial Youth Worlds-Pantelis Kirpoglou.

2015: 2nd in U16 4,7 Youth Europeans 2015-Dimitris Papadimitriou.

2015: 4th in U16 4,7 Youth Worlds 2015-Dimitris Papadimitriou

2014: 2nd in 4,7 Youth Worlds 2014-Konstantinos Chousiadas

2012: 6th in Radial Youth Worlds 2012-Charis Mavrogeorgis

2011: 6th in U17 Radial Youth Worlds 2011-Charis Mavrogeorgis

National titles 

2022: 1st Laser Radial Men National Champion

2022: 2nd Laser Radial Men National Champion

2022: 1st Laser Radial U21 National Champion

2022: 1st Laser Radial U19 National Champion

2022: 3rd Laser Radial U21 National Champion

2022: 2nd Laser Radial U19 Girls National Champion

2022: 3rd Laser Radial U19 Girls National Champion

2021: 1st Laser Standard Men National Champion

2021:1st Laser 4.7 Girls National Champion

2021: 3rd Laser Radial U17 National Champion

2021: 2nd U17 – 3rd U19 Laser Radial National Champion

2021: 2nd Laser Radial National Champion

2020: 2nd Laser Radial National Champion

2020: 3rd Laser 4.7 U16 National Champion

2020: 3rd Laser 4.7 Girls U16 National Champion

2019: 2nd Laser 4.7 U16 National Champion

2019: 2nd Laser Standard Men and U21 National Champion

2019: 3rd Laser Standard Men National Champion

2018: 1st 4,7 U16 Champion

2018: 2nd Radial Women Champion

2018: 2nd Standard Champion

2018: 1st and 2nd Radial Champion

2017: 1st Radial National Champion.

2017: 1st Radial National U16 Champion.

2017: 3rd Standard National Champion.

2017: 3rd 4,7 National Champion.

2016: 1st, 2nd, and 3rd Radial National Champion.

2015: 3rd Radial National Champion.

2015: 2nd and 3rd 4,7 National Champion.

2014: 1st and 3rd Radial National Champion.

2012: 1st and 2nd Radial National Champion.

References 

Greek male sailors (sport)
1980 births
Living people
Olympic sailors of Greece
Sailors at the 2004 Summer Olympics – Laser
Sailors at the 2008 Summer Olympics – Laser
Sailors at the 2012 Summer Olympics – Laser